Eddie Jefferson (August 3, 1918 – May 9, 1979) was an American jazz vocalist and lyricist. He is credited as an innovator of vocalese, a musical style in which lyrics are set to an instrumental composition or solo. Jefferson himself claims that his main influence was Leo Watson. Perhaps Jefferson's best-known song is "Moody's Mood for Love" which was recorded in 1952, though two years later a recording by King Pleasure catapulted the contrafact into wide popularity (King Pleasure even cites Jefferson as a personal influence). Jefferson's recordings of Charlie Parker's "Parker's Mood" and Horace Silver's "Filthy McNasty" were also hits.

Biography
Jefferson was born in Pittsburgh, Pennsylvania, United States. One of his most notable recordings, "So What", combined the lyrics of artist Christopher Acemandese Hall with the music of Miles Davis to highlight his skills, and enabled him to turn a phrase, into his style he calls jazz vocalese.

Jefferson's last recorded performance was at the Joe Segal's Jazz Showcase in Chicago and was released on video by Rhapsody Films. He shared the stand with Richie Cole (alto sax), John Campbell (piano), Kelly Sill (bass) and Joel Spencer (drums). The performance was part of a tour that Jefferson and Cole led together. Their opening night in Detroit, Michigan, was at Baker's Keyboard Lounge, a jazz club built in the 1930s that has played host to famous musicians including those who spanned the genre with artists as diverse as Dexter Gordon and Sonny Stitt.

A previously unreleased live recording from July 1976 was released in August 2009 as Eddie Jefferson At Ali's Alley, with the quintet of drummer Rashied Ali featured.

Eddie Jefferson was shot and killed outside Baker's Keyboard Lounge on May 8, 1979, aged 60. He had left the club with fellow bandleader Cole around 1:35 a.m. and was shot while walking out of the building. A late-model Lincoln Continental was spotted speeding away from the scene. The driver was later picked up by Detroit police and identified as a disgruntled dancer with whom Jefferson once worked and had fired from a gig. The suspect was charged with murder, but was later acquitted in a Detroit criminal trial.

The Manhattan Transfer honored both Jefferson and Coleman Hawkins in their vocal version of "Body and Soul" on their album Extensions in 1979.

Discography
 Letter from Home (Riverside, 1962)
 Body and Soul (Prestige, 1968)
 Come Along with Me (Prestige, 1969)
 The Bebop Singers with Annie Ross, Joe Carroll (Prestige, 1970)
 Things Are Getting Better (Muse, 1974)
 Still on the Planet (Muse, 1976)
 The Jazz Singer (Inner City, 1976)
 The Main Man (Inner City, 1977)
 The Live-Liest (Muse, 1979)

With Richie Cole
 New York Afternoon (Muse, 1977)
 Alto Madness (Muse, 1977)
 Keeper of the Flame (Muse, 1979)	
 Live at the Douglas Beach House 1978 (Just Jazz, 1995)
 Hollywood Madness (Muse, 1979)

With Dexter Gordon
 Great Encounters (Columbia , 1978)

With James Moody
 Moody's Workshop (Prestige, 1954)
 Hi Fi Party (Prestige, 1955)
 Flute 'n the Blues (Argo, 1956)
 Moody's Mood for Love (Argo, 1957)
 Hey! It's James Moody (Argo, 1959)
 Cookin' the Blues (Argo, 1964)
 Don't Look Away Now! (Prestige, 1969)
 James Moody's Heritage Hum (Perception, 1971)

With Frank Wright
 Kevin, My Dear Son (Recorded: October 1978) (Chiaroscuro, 1979)

See also
 List of homicides in Michigan
The Bank Dick (for the "Filthy McNasty" character)

References

External links
Eddie Jefferson's Artist Page
WSU Virtual Motor City Collection
 "Celebrating the Life of EDDIE JEFFERSON – Innovator, Tap Dancer, Lyricist & Founding Father of the 'Art of Jazz Vocalese'", Washington DC Jazz Network

1918 births
1979 deaths
American jazz singers
Musicians from Pittsburgh
Vocalese singers
Muse Records artists
Prestige Records artists
Riverside Records artists
Inner City Records artists
People murdered in Michigan
Deaths by firearm in Michigan
Murdered African-American people
American murder victims
20th-century American singers
Singers from Pennsylvania
Jazz musicians from Pennsylvania
20th-century American male singers
American male jazz musicians
1979 murders in the United States
20th-century African-American male singers